Komlenović is a Serbian surname. It may refer to:

Komlenović noble family, in Hum
Pavle Komlenović, knez
Nikola Komlenović, Yugoslav geologist
Uroš Komlenović, Serbian journalist and writer
Vasilije Komlenović, Montenegrin footballer
Vladanko Komlenović, Bosnian footballer
Radoslav Komlenović, Serbian politician

See also
Komljenović, surname
Komnenović, surname
Komlenići, village in Croatia
Komlenac, village in Bosnia and Herzegovina

Serbian surnames